John Byrne, sometimes known as John M. Byrne (born in Dublin, Ireland) is a writer, author, cartoonist, performer, and broadcaster.

Early career 
Byrne started his career as a communications officer for UNICEF in Malawi. After returning to England in 1989 he started a "live cartoons" show, a combination of stand-up comedy, art class and audience participation and performed at festivals, school libraries and corporate events.

Biography 
Byrne's cartoons have featured regularly in a wide range of newspapers and magazines. He has also worked for Christian Herald, Private Eye, the BBC's in-house magazine Ariel, Voluntary Sector magazine, Young Performers magazine, and as a careers advisor and agony uncle for The Stage newspaper.

Broadcasting 
Byrne's broadcasting and writing credits include TV and radio work for BBC TV, BBC World Service, Nickelodeon, ITV, Channel Five, Virgin Radio and ‘script doctoring’ roles for several shows and musicals.

Selected bibliography 

 Writing Comedy (3rd Edition)
 A Singer’s Guide to Getting Work (with Julie Payne)
 The Little Book of Cool at School
 Drawing Cartoons that Sell
 A Dancer’s Guide to Getting Work (with Jenny Belingy)
 The Bullybuster’s Joke Book

References

External links 
Performing Careers, Byrne's professional website
Byrne's profile as a tutor for London Art College

British non-fiction writers
Living people
British cartoonists
British children's writers
Irish cartoonists
Irish children's writers
British male writers
Year of birth missing (living people)
Male non-fiction writers